An Italian in America is a 1967 Commedia all'italiana film co-written  and directed by Alberto Sordi and starring the same Sordi opposite Vittorio De Sica. Screenwriter Rodolfo Sonego was inspired for the plot  by the participation of one of his friends, the painter Salvatore Scarpitta, to the NBC program This Is Your Life.

Plot

Cast 
Alberto Sordi as Giuseppe Marozzi
Vittorio De Sica as  Lando Marozzi
 Franco Valobra  as   Giuseppe's Communist friend
Bill Dana as TV presenter
Gray Frederickson
Lou Perry
Valentino Macchi
 Alice Conden

References

External links
 

Italian comedy films
Commedia all'italiana
1967 comedy films
1967 films
Films directed by Alberto Sordi
Films scored by Piero Piccioni
Films shot in New York City
1960s Italian-language films
1960s Italian films